Kipo and the Age of Wonderbeasts is an animated television series created by Radford Sechrist and developed by Bill Wolkoff, adapted from Rad's 2015 webcomic Kipo. The series is produced by American company DreamWorks Animation Television and animated by South Korean studio Mir.

The young adult animated series follows a girl named Kipo Oak, who is searching for her father after being forced to flee from her burrow, and must explore the post-apocalyptic surface world ruled by mutated animals to find him. Along the way, she befriends human survivors Wolf and Benson, and the mutant animals Dave and Mandu.

The series has been critically acclaimed for its design, characterization, music, world-building, voice acting, and diversity. The series is particularly notable for its representation of LGBT and characters of color.

The show's three seasons, each ten episodes long, were released in 2020. Season 1 was released on January 14, season 2 on June 12, and season 3 on October 12.

The show made its linear debut on Pop in the United Kingdom on October 3, 2022.

Plot
In 2020, animals mutated into anthropomorphic creatures called "mutes". Mutes rose up against the human race, forcing the majority of it to live in underground cities called burrows. In the 23rd century, Los Angeles has been reduced to a post-apocalyptic wasteland collectively known as "Las Vistas".

In the first season, Kipo Oak, a thirteen-year-old girl, is separated from her father Lio after their burrow is attacked by a "mega monkey", a colossal, mutated spider monkey. Traversing Las Vistas, she befriends Wolf, a cold and hardened girl who has been surviving on her own after her adoptive wolf family turned on her, the upbeat Benson and his insect companion Dave, and the mute pig Mandu.  Together, they set out to find the burrow Kipo's community fled to after their first one was destroyed. During their adventures, Kipo discovers that she has the DNA of a mega jaguar, and can transform her body. As the five journey along they make many mute allies and enemies, including the tyrant Scarlemagne, a mandrill mute who intends to subjugate humanity with his mind-controlling pheromones and force the other mutes into an utopian empire which he will rule with a human army.

In the second season, Kipo learns she was experimented with mute DNA by her parents before her birth, turning her into a half-human, half-jaguar hybrid, and that her mother Song, previously thought to be deceased, is actually the mega monkey who destroyed her burrow, mutated as a side effect from her pregnancy and mind-controlled with Scarlemagne's pheromones by Dr. Emilia, her parents' former employer who now leads a resistance group against mutes. She also discovers that Scarlemagne was originally an ordinary mandrill named Hugo whom Kipo's parents turned sentient and secretly raised as their son, but grew to hate them after they were forced to abandon him. Kipo frees Song from her mind control and defeats Scarlemagne, while Emilia plots to revert mutes back into normal animals.

In the third season, Kipo creates the "Human Mute Ultimate Friendship Alliance" (HMUFA) to fight Emilia, but struggles to make humans and mutes work together. Emilia creates an anti-mute cure with Kipo's DNA, and it is with this cure that Kipo turns her mother human again. Ultimately, Kipo succeeds in making peace between mutes and humans, reforming Scarlemagne in the process. With her plans foiled and unwilling to accept change, Emilia turns herself into a mega mute to kill Kipo and her friends, but she is defeated with Scarlemagne's help, who sacrifices himself to save Kipo. Five years later, Kipo happily lives on the surface where humans and mutes finally co-exist in harmony.

Characters

Main

 Kipo Oak (voiced by Karen Fukuhara) – An enthusiastic and curious young girl who is searching for her people. She later learns that her parents injected her with mute DNA, giving her the powers of a huge purple jaguar.
 Wolf (voiced by Sydney Mikayla) – Kipo's best friend and adopted sister. A hardened and young survivor on the surface world who was raised by wolves. She wields a spear made from the stinger of a deathstalker scorpion that she dubs "Stalkie".
 Benson Mekler (voiced by Coy Stewart) – A happy-go-lucky surface survivor, Dave's best friend, and last of the "fanatics", a group previously at war with Dave's species for two centuries.
 Dave (voiced by Deon Cole) – A mutant insect and Benson's best friend who repeatedly molts from baby to child to teen to adult to elderly. He is the last of his kind, a species of identical-looking insects who all shared the name Dave and were at war for over two centuries with the "fanatics" over a cooling fan.
 Mandu (voiced by Dee Bradley Baker) – A mutant pig with four eyes and six legs adopted by Kipo.
 Lio Oak (voiced by Sterling K. Brown) – Kipo's father, a scientist, and teacher of their underground community. He and Song were originally working for Dr. Emilia to turn mutes back into normal animals so humanity could reclaim the surface.
 Hugo "Scarlemagne" Oak (voiced by Dan Stevens) – A deranged, flamboyant, power-hungry mandrill and Kipo's adoptive older brother. He seeks to create a mute-only utopia and rule Las Vistas with an army of enslaved humans. Due to human experimentation, the pheromones in his sweat can control primate minds.
 Song Oak (voiced by Jee Young Han) – Kipo's mother and Lio's wife who originally worked with him to revert mutes back into normal animals before they changed their minds; thought to be deceased, she is later revealed to be alive.
 Dr. Emilia (voiced by Amy Landecker) – A cold-hearted, manipulative, remorseless human scientist who wants to end the mutes' existence.

Supporting
 Molly Yarnchopper (voiced by Lea Delaria) – A Timbercat and Yumyan Hammerpaw's second-in-command.
 Yumyan Hammerpaw (voiced by Steve Blum) – Axe Lord of the Timbercats. His name is a parody of the tall tale character Paul Bunyan.
 Cotton (voiced by Grey Griffin) – Rocker leader of the Umlaut Snakes from Cactus Town.
 Good Billions and Bad Billions (voiced by John Hodgman and GZA/Guy Lockard) – Astronomer co-leaders of the Newton Wolves.
 Jamack (voiced by Jake Green) – A Mod Frog and enemy of Kipo after she caused him to be banished from his pack, but later becomes an ally.
 Tad Mulholland (voiced by Michael-Leon Wooley) – A sentient colony of tardigrades who traps others in dream worlds.
 Hoag (voiced by Jeff Bennett) – A member of Kipo's underground community and Doag's father.
 Troy Sandoval (voiced by Giullian Yao Gioiello) – A boy from Kipo's underground community and Benson's boyfriend.
 Asher and Dahlia Berdacs (voiced by River Butcher and Fryda Wolff) – Twin siblings from Kipo's underground community. Asher is non-binary while Dahlia is female.
 Amy and Brad (voiced by Avrielle Corti and Ace Gibson) – A pair of rats who manage an amusement park called Ratland.
 Zane and Greta (voiced by Carlos Alazraqui and Anna Vocino) – Dr. Emilia's assistants.
 Roberto Sandoval (voiced by Antonio Alvarez) – Troy's father.
 Fun Gus (voiced by Jack Stanton) – A sentient mold with a child-like personality.
 Label (voiced by Betsy Sodaro) – A Fitness Raccoon.
 Mrs. Sartori (voiced by Grey Griffin) – Leader of the Mod Frogs.
 Easy (voiced by Matt Lowe) – Leader of the Humming Bombers.
 Doag (voiced by Rebecca Husain) – Hoag's dance-obsessed daughter.
 Gerard (voiced by Dee Bradley Baker) – An orangutan Noble.
 Lemieux (voiced by Grey Griffin) – A tarsier Noble.
 Loretta and Wheels (voiced by Grey Griffin and Alanna Ubach) – Co-leaders of the Scooter Skunks.
 Harris and Kwat (voiced by Ian Harding and Grey Griffin) – A pair of Mod Frogs and Jamack's former goons.
 Camille (voiced by Joan Jett and Grey Griffin) – An Umlaut Snake.
 Puck (voiced by John Lavelle) – A theater musician otter.
 Ida, Florabel, and Bev (voiced by Kay Bess, Chris Anthony Lansdowne, and Mindy Sterling) – The "Chevre Sisters", a trio of blind, soothsaying goats.
 Ruffles (voiced by Matt Lowe) – A Timbercat.
 Tongue Depressor (voiced by David Neher) – A Fitness Raccoon.
 Margot (voiced by Faith Graham and Victoria Grace) – Wolf's adoptive wolf sister.
 Mr. Filburn (voiced by Jake Green) – A member of Kipo's underground community.
 Lily and Earl Berdacs (voiced by Kay Bess and Carlos Alazraqui) – Asher and Dahlia's parents.
 Hyun-soo (voiced by Raymond J. Lee) – Lead singer of a narwhal K-pop band.
 Boom-Boom (voiced by Alanna Ubach) – A Humming Bomber.

Production

Development
Kipo and the Age of Wonderbeasts was created by Radford Sechrist, previously a storyboard artist for Dan Vs. and later director on the Voltron: Legendary Defender. After quitting his job as an animator, Sechrist began posting the webcomic Kipo on Tumblr in 2015. The animated series based on the webcomic was first announced at the Annecy International Animated Film Festival in June 2019. Sechrist compared the series to The Wizard of Oz, "but instead of ruby slippers [Kipo] has Converse on".

The series has five writers in addition to showrunner Sechrist and executive producer Bill Wolkoff. They worked in two teams, each comprising a director and three board artists. The animation is made by Studio Mir in South Korea using traditional animation methods. About sixty people worked on the series at DreamWorks, and about fifty-five at Studio Mir.

LGBTQ representation

As Netflix pushed forward, Kipo and the Age of Wonderbeasts became a notable example of expanded representation. In the first season of Kipo, which streamed on January 10, Benson said outright he was gay, saying he only liked the series protagonist, Kipo, in a platonic way. He also developed a crush on a male character, Troy, in the show's 10th episode. Due to these elements, some noted the show's "casual queerness."

The series was nominated for a GLAAD Media Award for Outstanding Kids & Family Programming.

In August 2021, Sechrist told Insider that he and Wolkoff realized that there weren't "iconic Superman or Spider-Man archetypes very often as a gay person in media" saying that gay people would be villains or comic relief, with their pitch for Benson as part of the show, making history, becoming the first Black gay protagonist and "second-known animated kids character" apart from a character in 6teen to "identify themselves as gay in dialogue."

Music
The soundtrack to the series, including several original songs, was composed by Daniel Rojas. It draws on an eclectic mix of musical styles, from folk to classical music and hip-hop, with Wu-Tang Clan founding member and Bad Billions' voice actor GZA being given co-writing credit for the 'Newton Wolves Rap'. The first soundtrack album, Kipo and the Age of Wonderbeasts: Season 1 Mixtape, was released in January 2020 by Back Lot Music. The second soundtrack album, titled Kipo and the Age of Wonderbeasts: Season 2 Mixtape, was released in late May 2020 by Back Lot Music.

Episodes

Series overview

Season 1 (2020)

Season 2 (2020)

Season 3 (2020)

Mixtapes

Reception
All three seasons of Kipo and the Age of Wonderbeasts have a 100% score on Rotten Tomatoes, with too few reviews for a consensus. At io9, Beth Elderkin described Kipo as a "must-watch", writing that it joined the likes of She-Ra and the Princesses of Power, Gravity Falls and Steven Universe as a series with a broad appeal to many age groups, and highlighting its music and art design. At Collider, Dave Trumbore noted Kipos similarity to other recent female-led animated portal fantasy series such as Amphibia and The Owl House, and described it as a "classic in the making" that drew on cultural touchstones such as Fallout, The Warriors, The Island of Doctor Moreau, Planet of the Apes and Alice in Wonderland.
NPR argued that the series is colorful and funny, with its diversity allowing it comment on sexuality, race, and class, combining the world-building in Avatar: The Last Airbender and the inclusivity, and heart, of a show like Steven Universe. Forbes said that Kipo, like the "fellow empath Steven Universe," attempts to talk antagonists about their feelings.

Writing for Polygon, Petrana Radulovic appreciated that beneath a standard fantasy exploration quest, the series is a "vibrant mosaic, with a unique world, multidimensional character relationships, and a deeper underlying plot" about the tensions between mutes and humans. She also noted that Benson was the first character to have an explicit coming out as gay in an all-ages animation series, and that the understated manner of the scene, in episode 6, made it all the more noteworthy. Charles Pulliam-Moore at io9 likewise wrote that the series's "casual queerness is fantastic" because Benson's orientation is not treated as a plot point to complicate Kipo's feelings for him, but, "with a distinct matter-of-factness", as just one aspect of his character. Dave Trumbore of Collider noted that the show explores "burgeoning same-sex relationships in a positive manner," referring to the relations between Benson and Troy. A review of the season by Shamus Kelley pointed out the continued flirting between Troy and Benson, with Benson trying to impress him, and his dad, praising that their relationship has had "zero drama...[and] zero subtext," treated as a "regular thing without any of the restrictions gay characters have had before." Kevin Johnson wrote about how in Kipo, "the surface world of earth is genuinely dangerous, and each character, still couched in their Blackness, represents different perspectives," exploring race like Steven Universe explored gender, and is willing to "explore the messiness of racial issue," believing that Kipo could become "a beacon through the thorny, fraught issues of race," just as Steven taught young viewers how to "let compassion and kindness guide them through encountering and dealing with gender concerns."

TV Guide called Kipo a "wildly imaginative story" with diverse characters. Petrana Radulovic of Polygon said that Kipo is like Steven Universe, the protagonist of the series of the same name, in that she wants peace, wanting everyone to "set aside their differences and talk through their problems" and called it a "celebration of differences."  Shannon Miller of The A.V. Club said that it better to think of the series akin to a "lengthy film split into three hearty acts." Beth Elderkin of Gizmodo called the relationship between Benson and Troy "perfect." Shamus Kelley of Den of Geek praised the "charmingly cute romance" between Benson and Troy and said they were delighted both were still "together in the five-year time skip." GLAAD praised the series as being "LGBTQ-inclusive" and said that Benson's story "reflected the full diversity of the community."

Influence
In June 2020, Bill Wolkoff, co-screenwriter of Kipo and the Age of Wonderbeasts, said that they were lucky and glad the studio empowered this, wanting to have a "young, 16-ish year old kid" who was gay and was not ashamed of it. He also said he hoped for a season 3, but couldn't confirm it would happen. Adding to this, Shannon Miller wrote a review praising the show, specifically calling Benson the "joyful culmination of a long battle for intentional queer representation in Westernized youth animation," which has made progress from 2010 to 2020, while noting shows like Steven Universe, Adventure Time, and She-Ra and the Princesses of Power paved the way for Kipo. Miller further noted how ND Stevenson and Rebecca Sugar "faced immense challenges while dealing with merely the visual component of queerness."

In October 2020, The A.V. Club published an interview with Rad Sechrist and Bill Wolkoff of Kipo. In the interview, Wolkoff said that they did not face roadblocks in presenting Benson and Troy, crediting creators like ND Stevenson, Rebecca Sugar, and others for fighting "difficult battles before Kipo came along." He also noted how he fought for gay representation in the show, Once Upon A Time, saying they treated it "like a coming-of-age story," and said he is glad that the Season 1 episode "Ratland" meant a lot to young gay people, especially young Black people. Sechrist added that when they sold the show to DreamWorks, Peter Gal, then the head of development, stated that the character has to say "I'm gay" in an explicit way.

The same month, Fukuhara, who also voices Glimmer in She-Ra, said that it would be cool if She-Ra moved into "feature-length storytelling," with a movie focused on Bow and how he grew up with Glimmer. She also hinted that a crossover between She-Ra and Kipo could happen because although they are stories on different worlds, they could cross paths if the She-Ra crew came to Earth, helping Kipo defeat a "greater evil," leading them to band together and fight.

Accolades

References

External links
 
 
Kipo And The Age Of Wonderbeasts (Season 3 Mixtape) on Spotify

2020 American television series debuts
2020 American television series endings
2020 animated television series debuts
2020s American animated television series
2020s American black cartoons
2020s American LGBT-related animated television series
2020s American science fiction television series
American children's animated action television series
American children's animated adventure television series
American children's animated science fantasy television series
Animated television series by Netflix
Anime-influenced Western animated television series
Asian-American television
English-language Netflix original programming
Gay-related television shows
LGBT speculative fiction television series
Post-apocalyptic animated television series
Television series by DreamWorks Animation
Television series by Studio Mir
Television series by Universal Television
Television series set in the 23rd century
Television shows based on webcomics